The Kunshan Sports Centre Stadium is a multi-purpose stadium in Kunshan, China.  It is currently used mostly for soccer matches.  The stadium holds 30,000 spectators.

References

 

Football venues in China
Multi-purpose stadiums in China
Sports venues in Suzhou
Kunshan